The 2008–09 Edmonton Oilers season was the team's 37th season of play, 30th as a member of the National Hockey League (NHL). Nonetheless, the Oilers celebrated their 30th anniversary.

Pre-season
The NHL Board of Governors on June 18 approved the sale of the Edmonton Oilers. All 34 members of the Edmonton Investors Group agreed in February to sell the club for $200 million to Rexall pharmacy magnate Daryl Katz. The new owner has promised to keep the team in Edmonton and pursue getting a new arena to replace Rexall Place.
On July 31, the Edmonton Oilers promoted Kevin Lowe to become president of hockey operations. They also announced that they have hired Steve Tambellini as their new general manager, and had also moved Kevin Prendergast, who was the vice-president of hockey operations, and named him the new assistant general manager.
On Friday August 8, the Edmonton Oilers announced that Rick Olczyk has been promoted to the position of assistant general manager and director of hockey operations/legal affairs.

Regular season

Divisional standings

Conference standings

Schedule and results

Playoffs
The Oilers were in the thick of the playoff race all the way until March 20th. However, they struggled down the stretch finishing 3-8-0 and missing the postseason by a total of six points.

Player statistics

Skaters

Goaltenders

†Denotes player spent time with another team before joining Oilers. Stats reflect time with Oilers only.
‡Traded mid-season. Stats reflect time with Oilers only.

Awards and records

Records
39 Years, 177 Days: A NHL record for the oldest goaltender ever played 60 games or more in a season by Dwayne Roloson.
39 Years, 170 Days: A new NHL record for the oldest goaltender ever played 60 games or more in a season by Dwayne Roloson on March 31, 2009.
36: Oilers record for most consecutive starts by Dwayne Roloson.
21: A new Oilers record for most consecutive starts by Dwayne Roloson on March 7, 2009.

Milestones

Transactions 
The Oilers have been involved in the following transactions during the 2008–09 season.

Trades

Free agents acquired

Free agents lost

Claimed via waivers

Player signings

Draft picks

Farm teams

See also
2008–09 NHL season

References

Player stats: Edmonton Oilers player stats on espn.com
Game log: Edmonton Oilers game log on espn.com
Team standings: NHL standings on espn.com

2008–09 in Canadian ice hockey by team
2008–09 NHL season by team
2008-09